The Dean of Waterford in the United Dioceses of Cashel and Ossory in the Church of Ireland is the dean of Christ Church Cathedral, Waterford.

List of deans of Waterford

?–1223 William Wace (afterwards Bishop of Waterford 1223) 
?–1252 Philip (afterwards Bishop of Waterford 1252) 
?–1286 Walter de Fulburn (afterwards Bishop of Waterford 1286) 
1308 David le Waleys 
?–1323 Nicholas Welifed (afterwards Bishop of Waterford 1323) 
1365 Walter la Reve 
1372 Lucas de Londres 
1379 Jo. Reder 
1395 Walter de Ludlow 
1396 William Whyte 
1459 John Collyn
1481 Robert Bron or Brown 
1522–1547 Robert Lombard 
1547–1566 Patrick Walsh (made Bishop of Waterford and Lismore 1551, retaining deanery in commendam until 1566) 
1566–1570 Peter White (dispossessed for nonconformity) 
1570–? David Cleere 
1603–1620 Richard Boyle (also Archdeacon of Limerick and Dean of Tuam and afterwards Bishop of Cork, Cloyne and Ross 1620) 
1621 Henry Sutton
1622/3 Anthony Martin
1625 Richard Jones  (afterwards Dean of Elphin, 1634)
1634–1635 Thomas Gray (afterwards Dean of Ardfert
1635–1637 James Margetson (afterwards Dean of Derry) 
1637/8–1640 Edward Parry (afterwards Dean of Lismore) 
1640 Gervase Thorpe 
1661/2 Thomas Potter 
1666 Thomas Ledisham 
1671 Daniel Burston 
1678 Arthur Stanhope (also Archdeacon of Lismore) 
1685–1689 Thomas Wallis  (afterwards Dean of Derry, 1690/1)
1691/2 John Dalton 
1697 John Eeles (also Archdeacon of Lismore) 
1722/3–1758 Hugh Bolton 
1759–1784 Cutts Harman 
1784–1804 Christopher Butson (afterwards Bishop of Clonfert and Kilmacduagh 1804) 
1804–1804 William Cole (died 1804) 
1804–1850 Ussher Lee
1850 Thomas Townsend (afterwards Bishop of Meath 1850) 
1850–1877 Edward Hoare
1877–1903 John Morgan
1904–1913 Henry Hackett
1913–1916 Maurice Day
1916–1919 Robert Miller (afterwards Bishop of Cashel and Waterford 1919)
1919 George Mayers
c.1968 Fergus William Day (died 1996)
retired 1973 Charles Wolfe  Wolfe was educated at Trinity College, Dublin and ordained in 1939. He served at Kinsale (curacy); Berehaven, Fermoy and Drumcannon (incumbencies); and Waterford (Archdeacon) prior to his appointment to the deanery. 
1998–2002 Peter Barrett (afterwards Bishop of Cashel and Ossory 2002}
2003–2011 Trevor R. Lester
2011–2021 Maria Jansson
2022–present Bruce Hayes

References

 
Diocese of Cashel and Ossory
Waterford